Government Arts College for Women, Sivaganga, is a general degree college located in Sivaganga, Tamil Nadu. It was established in the year 1998. The college is affiliated with Alagappa University. This college offers different courses in arts, commerce and science.

Departments

Science
Physics
Chemistry
Mathematics
Botany
Home Science
Computer Science

Arts and Commerce
Tamil
English
Economics
Business Administration
Commerce

Accreditation
The college is  recognized by the University Grants Commission (UGC).

References

External links

Educational institutions established in 1998
1998 establishments in Tamil Nadu
Colleges affiliated to Alagappa University